İnəkboğan (also, Inekbogan) is a village and municipality in the Gadabay Rayon of Azerbaijan.  It has a population of 2,901.  The municipality consists of the villages of İnəkboğan, Qasımlı, Köhnəqışlaq, and Kərimli.

References 

Populated places in Gadabay District